Shamal-Terek is a village in Osh Region of Kyrgyzstan. It is part of the Özgön District. Its population was 3,901 in 2021.

References

Populated places in Osh Region